Jack Harman may refer to
Jack Harman (British Army officer), British general
Jack Harman (artist), Canadian artist